Pierre-Olivier Lapie (2 April 1901 – 10 March 1994) was a French lawyer, politician, writer, and freedom fighter.

In 1936, Lapie was elected deputy under the Popular Front but was mobilized into service at the outbreak of World War II in 1939. He took part in the Norwegian campaign in February 1940 before joining Free France. He was then appointed Governor of Chad in November 1940, succeeding Félix Éboué. In 1942, he obtained a command in the 13th Demi-Brigade of the Foreign Legion and served in Tunisia and Libya. He was reassigned as a Liaison to Britain in January 1943 before being appointed to the Provisional Consultative Assembly based in Algiers from October 1943 to August 1945. 

In September 1945, he was elected a deputy of Nancy to the First Constituent Assembly under the SFIO. In 1946, he was then reelected to the newly created National Assembly where he held several portfolios until an electoral defeat in 1958. He then aligned himself with the Social Gaullists and represented France on various European bodies. 

1901 births
1994 deaths
Writers from Rennes
Politicians from Rennes
Socialist Republican Union politicians
French Section of the Workers' International politicians
French Ministers of National Education
Members of the 16th Chamber of Deputies of the French Third Republic
Members of the Constituent Assembly of France (1945)
Deputies of the 1st National Assembly of the French Fourth Republic
Deputies of the 2nd National Assembly of the French Fourth Republic
Deputies of the 3rd National Assembly of the French Fourth Republic
French colonial governors and administrators
20th-century French novelists
French male essayists
French male novelists
20th-century French essayists
20th-century French male writers
Lycée Condorcet alumni
Sciences Po alumni
Members of the High Authority of the European Coal and Steel Community